Benny is the surname of:

Benjamin Benny (1869–1935), member of Australian Senate
Bob Benny (1926–2011), Belgian singer and musical theatre performer born Emilius Wagemans
D. C. Benny, American stand-up comedian born Ben Wartofsky
Eric Benny (born 1978), former footballer and former manager of the India national football team
Grace Benny (1872–1944), first woman elected to local government in Australia
Jack Benny (1894–1974), American comedian, vaudeville performer and actor born Benjamin Kubelsky
Tasmyn Benny (born 1998), boxer from New Zealand

See also
 Bennie (surname)